The 1990 UCI Mountain Bike World Championships were held in Durango, Colorado, United States. These were the first World Championships in mountain biking to be organised by the Union Cycliste Internationale (UCI). The disciplines included were cross-country and downhill.

Mountain biking world championships had been held since 1986, but without the sanction of the UCI. There had in fact been multiple 'world championships' before 1990, with the United States and Europe holding rival events and each crowning a 'world champion' in each discipline. The UCI decided to host its inaugural world championships in the United States as it was the birthplace of mountain biking. On the recommendation of the United States Cycling Federation, the UCI chose Durango to host the event.

Medal summary

Men's events

Women's events

Medal table

References

External links

UCI Mountain Bike World Championships
International cycle races hosted by the United States
UCI Mountain Bike World Championships
Mountain biking events in the United States